Lilit Pipoyan (born June 16, 1955) is an Armenian musician, singer, and architect.

Pipoyan belongs to a narrow circle of modern Armenian musicians whose works present an alternative to the traditional folk, classical, spiritual and pop music.

Biography
Born in Yerevan to a family of artists, she graduated from the Spendiaryan specialized music school and later studied architecture, receiving her PhD in the Theory and History of Armenian Architecture.

Pipoyan's compositions are based on Armenian poetry and folklore. She is fond of medieval secular songs, for which she creates modern arrangements or new melodies when the originals are lost, with distinctly Armenian character.

She also composes music based on modern Armenian poetry. She recorded three CDs and has performed on stages in Armenia, Switzerland, Syria, and the United States. She lives in Yerevan with her husband and two children.

Discography
 Lialousin (1998)
 Rouben & Lilit (feat. Ruben Hakhverdyan) (1999)
 One Day of the City (2003)
 Blue Flower (2006)
 Nav (2012)
 Selected Songs of Komitas, Karaoke (2013)

External links
 Lilit Pipoyan Music at Last.fm
 Timely Hymns to a Timeless City - New York Times article

Architects from Yerevan
20th-century Armenian women singers
1955 births
Living people
Musicians from Yerevan
21st-century Armenian women singers